Mullino (Mulla) is a rural locality (a village) in Azyakovsky Selsoviet, Burayevsky District, Bashkortostan, Russia. The population was 336 as of 2010. There are 6 streets.

Geography 
Mullino is located 13 km southeast of Burayevo (the district's administrative centre) by road. Azyakovo is the nearest rural locality.

References 

Rural localities in Burayevsky District